The International Emmy Founders Award (or Founders Award) is given by the International Academy of Television Arts and Sciences  to individuals whose creative accomplishments have contributed in some way to the quality of global television production. The awards ceremony has taken place in New York City since 1980.

Winners

Rescinded awards

Kevin Spacey (2017) 
Actor and producer Kevin Spacey was chosen to be the recipient of the award for 2017, but the International Academy of Television Arts and Sciences later tweeted a reversal of their decision, following accusations of sexual misconduct by Spacey in 1986 towards a then-14-year-old Anthony Rapp.

Andrew Cuomo (2020) 
Andrew Cuomo, who was the Governor of New York at the time, received the award during the 2020 ceremony for his daily briefings during the early stages of the COVID-19 pandemic, which the International Academy said "effectively created television shows, with characters, plot lines, and stories of success and failure". However, shortly after Cuomo's resignation on August 24, 2021, following a report by the state attorney general into allegations of sexual harassment, the academy rescinded his award.

References

External links
Official Website

International Emmy Awards
International Emmy Award winners
International Emmy Founders Award winners